Badrakh Odonchimeg (born 12 October 1981 in Bayantsogt sum, Töv aimag) is an amateur Mongolian freestyle wrestler, who played for the women's middleweight category. Between 2007 and 2012, Odonchimeg had won a total of seven medals (four silver and three bronze) for the 63, 67, and 72 kg classes at the Asian Wrestling Championships. She also captured two bronze medals in the same division at the 2006 Asian Games in Doha, Qatar, and at the 2009 World Wrestling Championships in Herning, Denmark.

Odonchimeg represented Mongolia at the 2008 Summer Olympics in Beijing, where she competed for the women's 63 kg class. She received a bye for the preliminary round of sixteen match, before losing out to China's Xu Haiyan, with a two-set technical score (3–5, 0–4), and a classification point score of 1–3.

References

External links
 
 
 

Mongolian female sport wrestlers
1981 births
Living people
Olympic wrestlers of Mongolia
Wrestlers at the 2008 Summer Olympics
Wrestlers at the 2006 Asian Games
Asian Games medalists in wrestling
People from Töv Province
World Wrestling Championships medalists
Asian Games bronze medalists for Mongolia
Medalists at the 2006 Asian Games
20th-century Mongolian women
21st-century Mongolian women